The 1962 VFL season was the 66th season of the Victorian Football League (VFL), the highest level senior Australian rules football competition in Victoria. The season featured twelve clubs, ran from 21 April until 29 September, and comprised an 18-game home-and-away season followed by a finals series featuring the top four clubs.

The premiership was won by the Essendon Football Club for the eleventh time, after it defeated  by 32 points in the 1962 VFL Grand Final.

Premiership season
In 1962, the VFL competition consisted of twelve teams of 18 on-the-field players each, plus two substitute players, known as the 19th man and the 20th man. A player could be substituted for any reason; however, once substituted, a player could not return to the field of play under any circumstances.

Teams played each other in a home-and-away season of 18 rounds; matches 12 to 18 were the "home-and-way reverse" of matches 1 to 7.

Once the 18 round home-and-away season had finished, the 1962 VFL Premiers were determined by the specific format and conventions of the Page–McIntyre system.

Round 1

|- bgcolor="#CCCCFF"
| Home team
| Home team score
| Away team
| Away team score
| Venue
| Crowd
| Date
|- bgcolor="#FFFFFF"
| 
| 11.13 (79)
| 
| 6.15 (51)
| MCG
| 41,634
| 21 April 1962
|- bgcolor="#FFFFFF"
| 
| 12.8 (80)
| 
| 6.11 (47)
| Western Oval
| 30,752
| 21 April 1962
|- bgcolor="#FFFFFF"
| 
| 13.10 (88)
| 
| 19.13 (127)
| Princes Park
| 41,846
| 21 April 1962
|- bgcolor="#FFFFFF"
| 
| 12.13 (85)
| 
| 7.6 (48)
| Windy Hill
| 29,200
| 23 April 1962
|- bgcolor="#FFFFFF"
| 
| 5.8 (38)
| 
| 9.9 (63)
| Victoria Park
| 42,170
| 23 April 1962
|- bgcolor="#FFFFFF"
| 
| 14.13 (97)
| 
| 13.13 (91)
| Lake Oval
| 22,340
| 23 April 1962

Round 2

|- bgcolor="#CCCCFF"
| Home team
| Home team score
| Away team
| Away team score
| Venue
| Crowd
| Date
|- bgcolor="#FFFFFF"
| 
| 10.13 (73)
| 
| 13.7 (85)
| Junction Oval
| 23,200
| 28 April 1962
|- bgcolor="#FFFFFF"
| 
| 7.7 (49)
| 
| 8.8 (56)
| Kardinia Park
| 20,344
| 28 April 1962
|- bgcolor="#FFFFFF"
| 
| 6.7 (43)
| 
| 16.15 (111)
| Brunswick Street Oval
| 18,754
| 28 April 1962
|- bgcolor="#FFFFFF"
| 
| 7.9 (51)
| 
| 10.8 (68)
| Arden Street Oval
| 15,496
| 28 April 1962
|- bgcolor="#FFFFFF"
| 
| 13.9 (87)
| 
| 10.15 (75)
| Glenferrie Oval
| 23,500
| 28 April 1962
|- bgcolor="#FFFFFF"
| 
| 9.11 (65)
| 
| 11.9 (75)
| Punt Road Oval
| 17,784
| 28 April 1962

Round 3

|- bgcolor="#CCCCFF"
| Home team
| Home team score
| Away team
| Away team score
| Venue
| Crowd
| Date
|- bgcolor="#FFFFFF"
| 
| 18.10 (118)
| 
| 12.7 (79)
| Kardinia Park
| 25,819
| 5 May 1962
|- bgcolor="#FFFFFF"
| 
| 9.11 (65)
| 
| 16.7 (103)
| Brunswick Street Oval
| 16,981
| 5 May 1962
|- bgcolor="#FFFFFF"
| 
| 12.22 (94)
| 
| 9.13 (67)
| Windy Hill
| 22,500
| 5 May 1962
|- bgcolor="#FFFFFF"
| 
| 16.14 (110)
| 
| 7.6 (48)
| Princes Park
| 19,933
| 5 May 1962
|- bgcolor="#FFFFFF"
| 
| 14.10 (94)
| 
| 4.11 (35)
| MCG
| 55,012
| 5 May 1962
|- bgcolor="#FFFFFF"
| 
| 7.14 (56)
| 
| 15.10 (100)
| Lake Oval
| 29,840
| 5 May 1962

Round 4

|- bgcolor="#CCCCFF"
| Home team
| Home team score
| Away team
| Away team score
| Venue
| Crowd
| Date
|- bgcolor="#FFFFFF"
| 
| 17.17 (119)
| 
| 10.11 (71)
| Western Oval
| 24,168
| 12 May 1962
|- bgcolor="#FFFFFF"
| 
| 6.15 (51)
| 
| 12.11 (83)
| Victoria Park
| 31,315
| 12 May 1962
|- bgcolor="#FFFFFF"
| 
| 13.15 (93)
| 
| 18.10 (118)
| Punt Road Oval
| 24,336
| 12 May 1962
|- bgcolor="#FFFFFF"
| 
| 7.14 (56)
| 
| 18.13 (121)
| Arden Street Oval
| 13,100
| 12 May 1962
|- bgcolor="#FFFFFF"
| 
| 10.15 (75)
| 
| 11.13 (79)
| Junction Oval
| 37,300
| 12 May 1962
|- bgcolor="#FFFFFF"
| 
| 12.6 (78)
| 
| 12.19 (91)
| Glenferrie Oval
| 22,300
| 12 May 1962

Round 5

|- bgcolor="#CCCCFF"
| Home team
| Home team score
| Away team
| Away team score
| Venue
| Crowd
| Date
|- bgcolor="#FFFFFF"
| 
| 16.8 (104)
| 
| 13.5 (83)
| MCG
| 20,748
| 19 May 1962
|- bgcolor="#FFFFFF"
| 
| 11.8 (74)
| 
| 9.16 (70)
| Glenferrie Oval
| 18,000
| 19 May 1962
|- bgcolor="#FFFFFF"
| 
| 13.12 (90)
| 
| 9.19 (73)
| Western Oval
| 30,661
| 19 May 1962
|- bgcolor="#FFFFFF"
| 
| 11.7 (73)
| 
| 17.16 (118)
| Princes Park
| 36,457
| 19 May 1962
|- bgcolor="#FFFFFF"
| 
| 10.13 (73)
| 
| 13.16 (94)
| Lake Oval
| 17,760
| 19 May 1962
|- bgcolor="#FFFFFF"
| 
| 11.9 (75)
| 
| 13.9 (87)
| Kardinia Park
| 27,788
| 19 May 1962

Round 6

|- bgcolor="#CCCCFF"
| Home team
| Home team score
| Away team
| Away team score
| Venue
| Crowd
| Date
|- bgcolor="#FFFFFF"
| 
| 8.15 (63)
| 
| 1.11 (17)
| MCG
| 25,737
| 26 May 1962
|- bgcolor="#FFFFFF"
| 
| 11.13 (79)
| 
| 8.8 (56)
| Brunswick Street Oval
| 14,781
| 26 May 1962
|- bgcolor="#FFFFFF"
| 
| 14.9 (93)
| 
| 13.9 (87)
| Windy Hill
| 37,000
| 26 May 1962
|- bgcolor="#FFFFFF"
| 
| 13.10 (88)
| 
| 12.8 (80)
| Junction Oval
| 33,600
| 26 May 1962
|- bgcolor="#FFFFFF"
| 
| 6.14 (50)
| 
| 19.15 (129)
| Arden Street Oval
| 14,140
| 26 May 1962
|- bgcolor="#FFFFFF"
| 
| 12.8 (80)
| 
| 10.4 (64)
| Victoria Park
| 34,528
| 26 May 1962

Round 7

|- bgcolor="#CCCCFF"
| Home team
| Home team score
| Away team
| Away team score
| Venue
| Crowd
| Date
|- bgcolor="#FFFFFF"
| 
| 14.7 (91)
| 
| 6.12 (48)
| Punt Road Oval
| 16,943
| 2 June 1962
|- bgcolor="#FFFFFF"
| 
| 7.11 (53)
| 
| 16.15 (111)
| Lake Oval
| 25,640
| 2 June 1962
|- bgcolor="#FFFFFF"
| 
| 9.9 (63)
| 
| 4.4 (28)
| Western Oval
| 40,224
| 2 June 1962
|- bgcolor="#FFFFFF"
| 
| 9.8 (62)
| 
| 12.22 (94)
| Glenferrie Oval
| 28,000
| 4 June 1962
|- bgcolor="#FFFFFF"
| 
| 10.10 (70)
| 
| 7.12 (54)
| Princes Park
| 32,000
| 4 June 1962
|- bgcolor="#FFFFFF"
| 
| 13.22 (100)
| 
| 9.8 (62)
| Kardinia Park
| 29,230
| 4 June 1962

Round 8

|- bgcolor="#CCCCFF"
| Home team
| Home team score
| Away team
| Away team score
| Venue
| Crowd
| Date
|- bgcolor="#FFFFFF"
| 
| 9.10 (64)
| 
| 6.8 (44)
| Kardinia Park
| 17,873
| 9 June 1962
|- bgcolor="#FFFFFF"
| 
| 12.4 (76)
| 
| 9.20 (74)
| Brunswick Street Oval
| 15,499
| 9 June 1962
|- bgcolor="#FFFFFF"
| 
| 9.10 (64)
| 
| 11.11 (77)
| Punt Road Oval
| 26,656
| 9 June 1962
|- bgcolor="#FFFFFF"
| 
| 9.15 (69)
| 
| 7.10 (52)
| Glenferrie Oval
| 21,000
| 9 June 1962
|- bgcolor="#FFFFFF"
| 
| 7.10 (52)
| 
| 15.19 (109)
| Arden Street Oval
| 18,503
| 9 June 1962
|- bgcolor="#FFFFFF"
| 
| 5.13 (43)
| 
| 6.10 (46)
| Junction Oval
| 38,300
| 9 June 1962

Round 9

|- bgcolor="#CCCCFF"
| Home team
| Home team score
| Away team
| Away team score
| Venue
| Crowd
| Date
|- bgcolor="#FFFFFF"
| 
| 11.18 (84)
| 
| 11.6 (72)
| MCG
| 48,952
| 23 June 1962
|- bgcolor="#FFFFFF"
| 
| 15.17 (107)
| 
| 10.7 (67)
| Windy Hill
| 35,000
| 23 June 1962
|- bgcolor="#FFFFFF"
| 
| 10.14 (74)
| 
| 9.11 (65)
| Victoria Park
| 26,488
| 23 June 1962
|- bgcolor="#FFFFFF"
| 
| 12.9 (81)
| 
| 9.10 (64)
| Princes Park
| 32,400
| 23 June 1962
|- bgcolor="#FFFFFF"
| 
| 10.13 (73)
| 
| 11.13 (79)
| Lake Oval
| 17,000
| 23 June 1962
|- bgcolor="#FFFFFF"
| 
| 10.8 (68)
| 
| 10.7 (67)
| Arden Street Oval
| 8,470
| 23 June 1962

Round 10

|- bgcolor="#CCCCFF"
| Home team
| Home team score
| Away team
| Away team score
| Venue
| Crowd
| Date
|- bgcolor="#FFFFFF"
| 
| 7.10 (52)
| 
| 6.12 (48)
| Kardinia Park
| 23,295
| 30 June 1962
|- bgcolor="#FFFFFF"
| 
| 12.10 (82)
| 
| 8.17 (65)
| Western Oval
| 20,579
| 30 June 1962
|- bgcolor="#FFFFFF"
| 
| 14.16 (100)
| 
| 13.10 (88)
| Victoria Park
| 25,479
| 30 June 1962
|- bgcolor="#FFFFFF"
| 
| 7.8 (50)
| 
| 12.14 (86)
| Lake Oval
| 10,150
| 30 June 1962
|- bgcolor="#FFFFFF"
| 
| 7.13 (55)
| 
| 10.13 (73)
| MCG
| 86,275
| 30 June 1962
|- bgcolor="#FFFFFF"
| 
| 6.15 (51)
| 
| 7.10 (52)
| Brunswick Street Oval
| 20,340
| 30 June 1962

Round 11

|- bgcolor="#CCCCFF"
| Home team
| Home team score
| Away team
| Away team score
| Venue
| Crowd
| Date
|- bgcolor="#FFFFFF"
| 
| 11.14 (80)
| 
| 14.12 (96)
| Glenferrie Oval
| 18,000
| 7 July 1962
|- bgcolor="#FFFFFF"
| 
| 8.10 (58)
| 
| 20.9 (129)
| Western Oval
| 34,032
| 7 July 1962
|- bgcolor="#FFFFFF"
| 
| 17.14 (116)
| 
| 6.12 (48)
| Princes Park
| 20,200
| 7 July 1962
|- bgcolor="#FFFFFF"
| 
| 10.8 (68)
| 
| 12.6 (78)
| Junction Oval
| 17,750
| 7 July 1962
|- bgcolor="#FFFFFF"
| 
| 10.16 (76)
| 
| 9.12 (66)
| Punt Road Oval
| 18,470
| 7 July 1962
|- bgcolor="#FFFFFF"
| 
| 13.16 (94)
| 
| 11.11 (77)
| Windy Hill
| 37,000
| 7 July 1962

Round 12

|- bgcolor="#CCCCFF"
| Home team
| Home team score
| Away team
| Away team score
| Venue
| Crowd
| Date
|- bgcolor="#FFFFFF"
| 
| 12.22 (94)
| 
| 5.15 (45)
| Arden Street Oval
| 9,543
| 14 July 1962
|- bgcolor="#FFFFFF"
| 
| 10.9 (69)
| 
| 12.12 (84)
| Punt Road Oval
| 21,174
| 14 July 1962
|- bgcolor="#FFFFFF"
| 
| 13.6 (84)
| 
| 16.6 (102)
| Glenferrie Oval
| 16,000
| 14 July 1962
|- bgcolor="#FFFFFF"
| 
| 5.19 (49)
| 
| 14.18 (102)
| Brunswick Street Oval
| 21,236
| 14 July 1962
|- bgcolor="#FFFFFF"
| 
| 16.12 (108)
| 
| 12.13 (85)
| Junction Oval
| 29,500
| 14 July 1962
|- bgcolor="#FFFFFF"
| 
| 8.9 (57)
| 
| 11.7 (73)
| Kardinia Park
| 30,591
| 14 July 1962

Round 13

|- bgcolor="#CCCCFF"
| Home team
| Home team score
| Away team
| Away team score
| Venue
| Crowd
| Date
|- bgcolor="#FFFFFF"
| 
| 13.11 (89)
| 
| 8.7 (55)
| Windy Hill
| 20,500
| 21 July 1962
|- bgcolor="#FFFFFF"
| 
| 15.9 (99)
| 
| 9.6 (60)
| Victoria Park
| 16,848
| 21 July 1962
|- bgcolor="#FFFFFF"
| 
| 9.13 (67)
| 
| 6.15 (51)
| Princes Park
| 19,029
| 21 July 1962
|- bgcolor="#FFFFFF"
| 
| 9.9 (63)
| 
| 11.14 (80)
| Lake Oval
| 14,380
| 21 July 1962
|- bgcolor="#FFFFFF"
| 
| 9.9 (63)
| 
| 10.19 (79)
| MCG
| 51,470
| 21 July 1962
|- bgcolor="#FFFFFF"
| 
| 10.5 (65)
| 
| 5.16 (46)
| Western Oval
| 17,721
| 21 July 1962

Round 14

|- bgcolor="#CCCCFF"
| Home team
| Home team score
| Away team
| Away team score
| Venue
| Crowd
| Date
|- bgcolor="#FFFFFF"
| 
| 6.11 (47)
| 
| 9.14 (68)
| Western Oval
| 28,801
| 28 July 1962
|- bgcolor="#FFFFFF"
| 
| 11.10 (76)
| 
| 10.12 (72)
| Victoria Park
| 19,115
| 28 July 1962
|- bgcolor="#FFFFFF"
| 
| 11.17 (83)
| 
| 16.13 (109)
| Glenferrie Oval
| 18,000
| 28 July 1962
|- bgcolor="#FFFFFF"
| 
| 13.16 (94)
| 
| 8.6 (54)
| Junction Oval
| 18,450
| 28 July 1962
|- bgcolor="#FFFFFF"
| 
| 11.17 (83)
| 
| 12.12 (84)
| Punt Road Oval
| 24,043
| 28 July 1962
|- bgcolor="#FFFFFF"
| 
| 7.6 (48)
| 
| 11.12 (78)
| Arden Street Oval
| 16,436
| 28 July 1962

Round 15

|- bgcolor="#CCCCFF"
| Home team
| Home team score
| Away team
| Away team score
| Venue
| Crowd
| Date
|- bgcolor="#FFFFFF"
| 
| 15.8 (98)
| 
| 7.12 (54)
| Kardinia Park
| 23,555
| 4 August 1962
|- bgcolor="#FFFFFF"
| 
| 7.8 (50)
| 
| 8.12 (60)
| Brunswick Street Oval
| 9,399
| 4 August 1962
|- bgcolor="#FFFFFF"
| 
| 15.7 (97)
| 
| 5.17 (47)
| Windy Hill
| 26,000
| 4 August 1962
|- bgcolor="#FFFFFF"
| 
| 8.11 (59)
| 
| 7.11 (53)
| Princes Park
| 18,250
| 4 August 1962
|- bgcolor="#FFFFFF"
| 
| 9.9 (63)
| 
| 10.20 (80)
| Lake Oval
| 17,200
| 4 August 1962
|- bgcolor="#FFFFFF"
| 
| 14.8 (92)
| 
| 11.11 (77)
| MCG
| 54,312
| 4 August 1962

Round 16

|- bgcolor="#CCCCFF"
| Home team
| Home team score
| Away team
| Away team score
| Venue
| Crowd
| Date
|- bgcolor="#FFFFFF"
| 
| 17.16 (118)
| 
| 22.11 (143)
| Brunswick Street Oval
| 10,169
| 11 August 1962
|- bgcolor="#FFFFFF"
| 
| 7.11 (53)
| 
| 12.23 (95)
| Victoria Park
| 30,000
| 11 August 1962
|- bgcolor="#FFFFFF"
| 
| 10.11 (71)
| 
| 11.17 (83)
| Arden Street Oval
| 10,339
| 11 August 1962
|- bgcolor="#FFFFFF"
| 
| 11.11 (77)
| 
| 15.4 (94)
| Punt Road Oval
| 15,992
| 11 August 1962
|- bgcolor="#FFFFFF"
| 
| 12.14 (86)
| 
| 11.10 (76)
| Junction Oval
| 36,300
| 11 August 1962
|- bgcolor="#FFFFFF"
| 
| 10.11 (71)
| 
| 9.8 (62)
| Windy Hill
| 39,000
| 11 August 1962

Round 17

|- bgcolor="#CCCCFF"
| Home team
| Home team score
| Away team
| Away team score
| Venue
| Crowd
| Date
|- bgcolor="#FFFFFF"
| 
| 10.8 (68)
| 
| 8.16 (64)
| Punt Road Oval
| 20,752
| 18 August 1962
|- bgcolor="#FFFFFF"
| 
| 14.18 (102)
| 
| 10.11 (71)
| Kardinia Park
| 26,707
| 18 August 1962
|- bgcolor="#FFFFFF"
| 
| 17.14 (116)
| 
| 11.8 (74)
| Princes Park
| 32,550
| 18 August 1962
|- bgcolor="#FFFFFF"
| 
| 7.10 (52)
| 
| 9.13 (67)
| Lake Oval
| 18,300
| 18 August 1962
|- bgcolor="#FFFFFF"
| 
| 12.11 (83)
| 
| 13.13 (91)
| Glenferrie Oval
| 9,600
| 18 August 1962
|- bgcolor="#FFFFFF"
| 
| 15.11 (101)
| 
| 9.10 (64)
| Western Oval
| 31,185
| 18 August 1962

Round 18

|- bgcolor="#CCCCFF"
| Home team
| Home team score
| Away team
| Away team score
| Venue
| Crowd
| Date
|- bgcolor="#FFFFFF"
| 
| 9.9 (63)
| 
| 12.10 (82)
| Arden Street Oval
| 10,602
| 25 August 1962
|- bgcolor="#FFFFFF"
| 
| 5.14 (44)
| 
| 18.14 (122)
| Brunswick Street Oval
| 18,447
| 25 August 1962
|- bgcolor="#FFFFFF"
| 
| 13.15 (93)
| 
| 13.10 (88)
| Windy Hill
| 20,900
| 25 August 1962
|- bgcolor="#FFFFFF"
| 
| 12.10 (82)
| 
| 7.11 (53)
| Victoria Park
| 23,936
| 25 August 1962
|- bgcolor="#FFFFFF"
| 
| 14.16 (100)
| 
| 9.11 (65)
| Junction Oval
| 17,450
| 25 August 1962
|- bgcolor="#FFFFFF"
| 
| 11.9 (75)
| 
| 5.10 (40)
| MCG
| 54,264
| 25 August 1962

Ladder

Consolation Night Series Competition
The night series were held under the floodlights at Lake Oval, South Melbourne, for the teams (5th to 12th on ladder) out of the finals at the end of the season.

Final: Richmond 8.16 (64) defeated Hawthorn 9.6 (60)

Premiership Finals

First Semi-Final

Second Semi-Final

Preliminary Final

Preliminary Final Replay

Grand final

Awards
 The 1962 VFL Premiership team was Essendon.
 The VFL's leading goalkicker was Doug Wade of Geelong who kicked 68 goals (including 6 goals in the final series).
 The winner of the 1962 Brownlow Medal was Alistair Lord of Geelong with 28 votes.
 South Melbourne took the "wooden spoon" in 1962.
Footscray 13.13 (91) defeated  10.8 (68) in the Grand Final, held as a curtain-raiser to the Preliminary Final Replay at the Melbourne Cricket Ground on 22 September.

Notable events
 Having abandoned live telecasts of the last quarters of VFL matches at the end of 1960, and having forbidden Saturday evening replays during the 1961 season, the VFL agreed to allow television stations to broadcast one hour of replays each Saturday evening, provided no more than 30 minutes of any one match was broadcast. A separate arrangement was made to allow a replay of the entire Grand Final match.
 St Kilda won its first match against Collingwood at Victoria Park since Round 2, 1919.
 On Anzac Day, a representative match was played at the Melbourne Cricket Ground between the Victorian team from the 1961 Brisbane Carnival, and a team representing the rest of the league. The Rest 13.7 (85) defeated the Carnival team 10.17 (77) in front of a crowd of 17,068.
From the ensuing ball-up, Carlton's Martin Cross punched the ball through for a rushed behind, and Carlton won by that point. Fitzroy did not protest the result; it did request that the Fitzroy Cricket Club install new sirens at the other end of the field, but the request was rejected.
 In September, the VFL purchased land to the east of Melbourne, at Mulgrave, upon which later built VFL Park.
 The Preliminary Final replay between Carlton and Geelong was by Carlton won by 5 points. In the final moments of the match, Geelong full forward Doug Wade took a strong mark directly in front of the Geelong goals, but he was penalised for interfering with Carlton full-back Peter Barry.
 In the Grand Final, a badly injured Geoff Leek played one of the best matches in his career to nullify Carlton's John Nicholls and pave the way for a sound 32 point win by Essendon.

References

 Hogan, P., The Tigers of Old, The Richmond Football Club, (Richmond), 1996. 
 Maplestone, M., Flying Higher: History of the Essendon Football Club 1872–1996, Essendon Football Club, (Melbourne), 1996. 
 Rogers, S. & Brown, A., Every Game Ever Played: VFL/AFL Results 1897–1997 (Sixth Edition), Viking Books, (Ringwood), 1998. 
 Ross, J. (ed), 100 Years of Australian Football 1897–1996: The Complete Story of the AFL, All the Big Stories, All the Great Pictures, All the Champions, Every AFL Season Reported, Viking, (Ringwood), 1996. 
 Ross, J. (ed.), The Australian Football Hall of Fame, HarperCollinsPublishers, (Pymble), 1999.

External links
 1962 Season – AFL Tables

Australian Football League seasons
Vfl season